Ootypus is a genus of beetles belonging to the family Cryptophagidae.

The species of this genus are found in Europe.

Species:
 Ootypus globosus (Waltl, 1838)

References

Cryptophagidae